Italian migration into what is today France has been going on, in different migrating cycles, for centuries, beginning in prehistoric times right to the modern age. In addition, Corsica passed from the Republic of Genoa to France in 1768, and the county of Nice and Savoy from the Kingdom of Sardinia to France in 1860. According to Robin Cohen, "about 5 million French nationals are of Italian origin if their parentage is retraced over three generations". According to official data of the Eurostat for 2012, the number of Italian citizens residing in France was 174,000.

History of Italians in France

Middle Ages and Renaissance
There has always been migration, since ancient times, between what is today Italy and France. This is especially true of the regions of northwestern Italy and southeastern France. As Italian wealth and influence grew during the Middle Ages, many Florentine, Genoese and Venetian traders, bankers and artisans settled, usually through family branches, throughout France. Regions of significant Italian diaspora sprang up as far north as Paris and Flanders. However it was not much as a percentage of the French global population.

This Italian migration developed more through the Renaissance, as previous generations became assimilated. Italian artists, writers and architects were called upon by the French monarchy and aristocrats, leading to a significant interchange of culture, but it was not a massive immigration of popular classes.

Since the 16th century, Florence and its citizens have long enjoyed a very close relationship with France. In 1533, at the age of fourteen, Catherine de' Medici married Henry, the second son of King Francis I and Queen Claude of France. Under the gallicised version of her name, Catherine de Médici, she became Queen consort of France when Henry ascended to the throne in 1547. Later on, after Henry died, she became regent on behalf of her ten-year-old son King Charles IX and was granted sweeping powers. After Charles died in 1574, Catherine played a key role in the reign of her third son, Henry III.

Other notable examples of Italians that played a major role in the history of France include Cardinal Mazarin, born in Pescina was a cardinal, diplomat and politician, who served as the chief minister of France from 1642 until his death in 1661. Mazarin succeeded his mentor, Cardinal Richelieu, and extended France's political ambitions not only within Italy but towards England as well.

Enrico Tonti, born near Gaeta, Italy (1649/50 - 1704) was an Italian-born soldier, explorer, and fur trader in the service of France. He was the son of Lorenzo de Tonti, a financier and former governor of Gaeta. Enrico was second in command of the La Salle expedition on his descent of the Mississippi River. Tonti's letters and journals are valuable source materials on these explorations.

Enrico's brother, Pierre Alphonse de Tonti, or Alphonse de Tonty, Baron de Paludy (ca. 1659 – 10 November 1727)[1] was an officer who served under the French explorer Cadillac and helped establish the first European settlement at Detroit, Michigan, Fort Pontchartrain du Detroit on the Detroit River in 1701. Several months later, both Cadillac and Tonty brought their wives to the fort, making them the first European women to travel into the interior of North America. He was the son of Lorenzo de Tonti who was a financier and former governor of Gaeta. Lorenzo de Tonti was the inventor of the form of life insurance known as the tontine. Henri de Tonti, involved in LaSalle's exploration of the Mississippi River and the establishment of the first settlement in Arkansas, was his older brother.

Modern period
Napoleon Bonaparte, French emperor and general, was ethnically Italian of Corsican origin, whose family was of Genoese and Tuscan ancestry.

Italian popular immigration to France only began in the late 18th century, really developed from the end of the 19th century until the World War I and became quite massive after this war. France needed workforce to compensate for the war losses and its very low birthrate. Initially, Italian immigration to modern France (late 18th to the early 20th century) came predominantly from northern Italy (Piedmont, Veneto), then from central Italy (Marche, Umbria), mostly to the bordering southeastern region of Provence. It wasn't until after World War II that large numbers of immigrants from southern Italy immigrated to France, usually settling in industrialised areas of France, such as Lorraine, Paris and Lyon.

Demographics 
The 2021 Report "Rapporto Italiano Nel Mondo 2021" Italian Report in the World 2021, recorded 444,113 Italian-born people.

Autochthonous populations

In both the County of Nice, parts of Savoy, "Italian" can refer to autochthonous speakers of Ligurian and Piedmontese languages, natives in the region since before annexation to France, and also to descendants of Italians that migrated to the areas when they were part of Italian states. The number of inhabitants with Italian ancestry is generally indeterminable, and the use of French language is now ubiquitous. In addition, Corsica was a part of the Republic of Genoa until 1768 and many Corsicans speak along with French the Corsican language, closely related to the Tuscan dialect of Italian.

Notable Italian French people 

The list is organized chronologically, listing Italians in France by birth date periods

First half of the 19th century
 Bonaparte family 
 Philippe Antoine d'Ornano (1784–1863), general and cousin of Napoleon Bonaparte
 Louis-Auguste Blanqui (1805–1881), politician. 
 Henri Cernuschi (Enrico Cernuschi; 1821–1896), banker, journalist, and art collector (born in Milan). His collection is known as the Musée Cernuschi
 Virginia Oldoini (1837–1899), mistress of Emperor Napoleon III
 Léon Gambetta (1838–1882), lawyer and politician (his father was from Genoa) 
 Émile Zola (1840–1902), writer and politician (his father, Francesco Zolla, was born in Venice) 
 Philippe Solari (1840–1906), artist
 Joseph Galliéni (1849–1916), French officer (father from Lombardy) 
 Jean-François Raffaëlli, (1850–1924), artist
 Raoul Pugno (1852–1914), composer, pianist
 Pierre Savorgnan de Brazza (Pietro Paolo Savorgnan di Brazzà; 1852–1905), explorer  (born at Castel Gandolfo, near Rome)
 Vincenzo Bellini (1801–1835), Italian-born opera composer
 Gioachino Rossini, (1792–1868) composer

Second half of the 19th century
 Clément Castelli (1870–1959), Italian-born painter (from Premia, Verbano-Cusio-Ossola region) 
 Vincent Scotto (1874–1952), composer
 Ricciotto Canudo (1879–1923), Italian-born writer (from Gioia del Colle)
 Ettore Bugatti (1881–1947), Italian-born automobile designer and manufacturer (from Milan)
 Rembrandt (Annibale) Bugatti (1884–1916), Italian-born sculptor (from Milan)
 Amedeo Clemente Modigliani (1884–1920), Italian-born painter and sculptor (from Livorno)
 Henri Bosco (Fernand Marius Bosco) (1888–1976), novelist
 Michel Carlini (1889–1967), lawyer and politician
 Elsa Schiaparelli (1890–1973), Italian-born fashion designer (from Rome)
 Jean Giono (1895–1970), novelist (Italian ancestry) 
 José Corti (José Corticchiato; 1895–1984), publisher 
 Lazare Ponticelli (Lazzaro Ponticelli; 1897–2008), Italian-born veteran of the First World War (from Bettola, near Piacenza) 
 Paul Belmondo (1898–1982), sculptor (born in Algiers of Italian ancestry) 
 Cino Del Duca (1899–1967), Italian-born businessman, film producer and philanthropist (from Montedinove, Ascoli Piceno)
 Guillaume Apollinaire (1880–1918), poet, playwright, short story writer, novelist and art critic (born in Rome)

1900s
 Fernand Joseph Désiré Contandin dit Fernandel (1903–1971), actor and singer
 Stéphane Grappelli (Stefano Grappelli; 1908–1997), jazz violinist (his father was from Alatri, near Frosinone)

1910s

 Rina Ketty (Rina Pichetto; 1911–1996), Italian-born singer (from Sarzana) 
 Marcel Bich (1914–1994), Italian-born manufacturer and co-founder of Bic (from Turin)
 Édith Piaf (Édith Giovanna Gassion; 1915–1963), singer (her mother, Line Marsa, born in Livorno, was of Italian-Berber descent)
 Achille Zavatta (1915–1993), clown 
 Léo Ferré (1916–1993), Singer and songwriter
 Henri Betti (1917–2005) composer and pianist (his father is born in Savona and his grandfather is born in Parma).
 Giuseppe Tacca (1917-1984), cyclist
 Claude Barma (1918–1992), director and screenwriter
 Jeanne Modigliani (1918-1984), historian
 Adolphe Deledda (1919-2003), cyclist

1920s
 César Baldaccini (1921–1998), sculptor
 Georges Brassens (1921–1981), singer
 Émile Bongiorni (1921–1949), footballer
 Stellio Lorenzi (1921–1990), screenwriter
 Yves Montand (Ivo Livi) (1921–1991), actor and singer
 Roger Grava (1922–1949), footballer
 Serge Reggiani (1922–2004), singer
 Pierre Cardin (Pietro Cardin) (1922–2020), fashion designer
 François Cavanna (1923–2014), author 
 Marcel Zanini (1923–2023), jazz musician
 Armand Gatti (1924–2017), also known as Dante Savoir Gatti, poet, author, playwright, director, screenwriter, producer, journalist
 Michel Piccoli (1925–2020), actor
 Raphaël Géminiani (born 1925), cyclist
 Philippe Castelli (1926–2006), actor
 Marcel Azzola (1927–2019), accordionist
 Remo Forlani (1927–2009), writer and screenwriter
 Emmanuelle Riva (1927–2017), actress
 Albert Uderzo (1927–2020), comic author
 Daniel Filipacchi (born 1928), photographer, art collector and publisher
 Jean Dotto (1928-2000), cyclist
 Willy Rizzo (1928–2013), photographer and designer
 Luc Ferrari (1929–2005), composer
 Claude Nougaro (1929–2004), jazz singer and poet

1930s
 Bernard Stasi (1930–2011), politician
 Robert Enrico (1931–2001), film director
 Roger Piantoni (1931–2018), footballer
 Annie Fratellini (1932–1997), circus artist, clown, singer and film actress 
 Francesca Solleville (born 1932), singer
 Paul Virilio (1932–2018), philosopher, cultural theorist and urbanist
 Max Gallo (1932–2017), writer, historian and politician
 Pierre Milza (1932–2018), historian 
 Jean-Paul Belmondo (born 1933), actor
 Loris Azzaro, (1933–2003), fashion designer and perfumer, born in Tunisia to Sicilian parents.
 Dalida (Iolanda Cristina Gigliotti) (1933–1987), singer, actress and Miss Egypt 1954.
 Emanuel Ungaro (1933–2019), fashion designer
 Nino Ferrer (Nino Agostino Arturo Maria Ferrari) (1934–1998), singer
 Lucien Bianchi (1934–1969), racing driver
 Pia Colombo (Eliane Marie Amélie) (1934–1986), singer
 Claude Faraldo (1936–2008), actor, screenwriter and film director
 Bruno Gigliotti (Orlando) (born 1936), music producer
 Christiane Martel (born 1936), actress and Miss Universe 1953
 Eugène Saccomano (1936–2019), journalist, author
 Claude François (1939–1978), singer and songwriter
 Michèle Mercier (born 1939), actress
 Liliane Montevecchi (1932–2018), actress, dancer, and singer

1940s

 Raymond Forni (1941–2008), politician
 Catherine Tasca (born 1941), politician
 Gilbert Bellone (born 1942), cyclist
 Edwige Fenech (born 1948), actor and film producer
 Jean-François Mattei (born 1943), doctor and politician
 Jean-Louis Bianco (born 1943), politician
 Pino Presti (born 1943), musician, composer and producer
 Luc Merenda (born 1943), actor
 Gérard Rinaldi (1943–2012), actor and singer
 Walter Spanghero (born 1943), rugby player
 Jean-Pierre Castaldi (born 1944), actor
 Nicole Grisoni, also known as Nicoletta (born 1944), singer
 Michel Gérard Joseph Colucci (Coluche) (1944–1986), humorist
 Daniel Bevilacqua (Christophe) (1945–2020), singer
 Jean-Claude Izzo (1945–2000), writer
 Patrick Modiano (born 1945), writer
 Richard Cocciante (Riccardo) (born 1946), singer 
 Alice Donadel, also known as Alice Dona (born 1946), singer
 Hervé Forneri, also known as Dick Rivers (1946–2019), singer
 Hubert Falco (born 1947), politician
 Max Guazzini (born 1947), entrepreneur
 Daniel Russo (born 1948), film actor
 Henri Proglio (born 1949), manager

1950s
 Corinne Cléry (born 1950), actress
 Richard Galliano (born 1950), accordionist
 Gérard Schivardi (born 1950), politician
 Claude Bartolone (born 1951), politician
 Fabrice Luchini (born 1951), stage and film actor
 Marc Cerrone (born 1952), musician, composer and producer
 Jean-Marc Todeschini (born 1952), politician
 Francis Cabrel (born 1953), singer
 Patrick de Carolis (born 1953), TV presenter
 Angelo Parisi (born 1953), judoka
 Philippe Risoli (born 1953), television and radio presenter
 Christian Estrosi (born 1955), politician
 Michel Platini (born 1955), footballer
 Thierry Beccaro (born 1956), actor and TV presenter
 André Vallini (born 1956), politician
 Michèle Rubirola (1956), politician
 Claude Onesta (born 1957), handball player
 Thierry Gilardi (1958–2008), stage actor and television presenter
 Jeannie Longo (born 1958), cyclist
 Thierry Mariani (born 1958), politician

1960s
 Gérard Onesta (born 1960), politician
 Catherine Malandrino (born 1963), fashion designer
 Stéphane Sanseverino (born 1961), singer
 Bruno Bellone (born 1962), footballer
 Michel Petrucciani (1962–1999), jazz pianist
 Roberto Alagna (born 1963), tenor singer
 Nadine Morano (born 1963), politician
 Jean Alesi (born 1964), Formula One driver
 Valeria Bruni-Tedeschi (born 1964), actress
 Christophe Neff (1964), geographer
 Eric Ciotti (born 1965), politician
 Jean-Marc Morandini (born 1965), journalist, radio, and TV host (Corsican father and Sardinian mother)
 Florent Emilio Siri (born 1965), film director and screenwriter
 Éric Cantona (born 1966), footballer
 Carla Bruni-Sarkozy (born 1967), actress
 David Ginola (born 1967), footballer
 Bruno Putzulu (born 1967), actor
 Jean-Michel Tinivelli (born 1967), actor
 Bruno Caliciuri (born 1968), singer-songwriter
 Tatiana Trouvé (born 1968), contemporary visual artist 
 Laurence Ferrari (born 1969), journalist and TV anchor
 Marianne James, singer, writer, actress

1970s
 Benjamin Castaldi (born 1970), television personality
 Marina Foïs (born 1970), actress
 Dominique Casagrande (born 1971), footballer
 Hélène Ségara (née Hélène Rizzo) (born 1971), singer
 Sylvie Testud (born 1971), actress, writer and film director
 Philippe Candeloro (born 1972), figure skater
 Julie Gayet (born 1972), actress and film producer
 Chiara Mastroianni (born 1972), actress and singer
 Vincent Candela (born 1973), footballer
 Aurélie Filippetti (born 1973), novelist and politician
 Florence Foresti (born 1973), comedian and actress
 Elsa Lunghini (born 1973), singer and actress
 Alessandro Mercuri (born 1973), author and director
 Laurent Sciarra (born 1973), basketball player
 Barbara Pompili (born 1975), politician
 Gilles Marini (born 1976), actor
 Alice Taglioni (born 1976), actress and model
 Fanny Biascamano (born 1979), singer

1980s
 Seth Gueko (Nicolas Salvadori) (born 1980), rapper
 Benoît Pedretti (born 1980), footballer
 Julie de Bona (born 1980), actress
 Roxane Mesquida (born 1981), actress and model
 Franck Signorino (born 1981), footballer
 Laëtitia Tonazzi (born 1981), footballer
 Jenifer (born 1982), singer and actress
 Vitaa (Charlotte Gonin) (born 1983), singer
 Mathieu Flamini (born 1984), footballer
 Pio Marmaï, (born 1984) actor
 Morgan Amalfitano (born 1985), footballer
 Élise Bussaglia (born 1985), footballer
 Anthony Scaramozzino (born 1985), singer
 Irene Curtoni (born 1985), ski racer
 Soko (singer) (born 1985), singer
 Charlotte Casiraghi (born 1986), princess of Monaco
 Olivier Giroud (born 1986), footballer
 Frédéric Sammaritano (born 1986), footballer
 Vincent Muratori (born 1987), footballer
 Elisa Sednaoui (born 1987), model, actress, philanthropist and film director
 Yoann Maestri (born 1988), rugby union player
 Romain Alessandrini (born 1989), footballer
 Romain Amalfitano (born 1989), footballer
 Jules Bianchi (1989–2015), Formula One driver
 Priscilla Betti (born 1989), singer, dancer and actress
 Vincent Laurini (born 1989), footballer
 Benjamin Toniutti (born 1989), volleyball player
 Guillaume Gigliotti (born 1989), footballer

1990s
 Rémy Cabella (born 1990), footballer
 Xavier Chiocci (born 1990), rugby player
 Sébastien Corchia (born 1990), footballer
 Nabilla Benattia (born 1992), model and TV personality
 Alexy Bosetti (born 1993), footballer
 Cindy Bruna (born 1994), model
 Yoan Cardinale (born 1994), footballer
 Paul Nardi (born 1994), footballer
 Enzo Crivelli (born 1995), footballer
 Sandie Toletti (born 1995), footballer
 Caroline Costa (born 1996), singer
 Fiona Ferro (born 1997), tennis player
 Delphine Cascarino (born 1997), footballer
 Estelle Cascarino (born 1997), footballer
 Paul Bernardoni (born 1997), footballer
 Olivier Boscagli (born 1997), footballer
 Lorenzo Callegari (born 1998), footballer
 Sonia Ben Ammar (born 1999), model and singer
 Nicolas Cozza (born 1999), footballer
 Fabio Quartararo (born 1999), Grand Prix Motorcycle racer

2000s
 Angelina (born 2006), singer

Gallery

See also
Italian diaspora
Corsicans

References

European diaspora in France
-
France
 
France
Immigration to France by country of origin